InterMiles was the airline's frequent-flyer program of Jet Airways (Jet Privilege Private Limited, (JPPL)) that ceased operations in April 2019, in which 50.1% stake is held by Etihad Airways, part of the Etihad Aviation Group.  InterMiles is an independent, loyalty and rewards company formed in 2014. The program has about 1 crore members.

InterMiles' main feature is allowing users to make online travel booking for flights and hotels through its app and website, and get rewarded as they earn and redeem InterMiles. Later, InterMiles added features to allow users to shopping, dine, fuel and introduced co-brand credit cards in India.

History 
In 2012, Jet Privilege Private Limited (JPPL) was formed to issue miles and award redemption tickets.

InterMiles (formerly known as JetPrivilege) was founded in 2014 is an independent entity, part of the Etihad Aviation Group formed with the sole purpose to market, develop and grow InterMiles, a loyalty and rewards programme.

Funding 
Etihad Airways bought a 50.1% stake in the company for $150 million in 2014. Jet Airways occupies a 49.9% stake in the company.

Partnerships 
InterMiles’ members can earn and redeem miles on flights, hotels, shopping, dining and even fuel. They also have multiple co-brand credit and debit cards, that provide the card holder with various benefits and discounts. This offer is available to co-brand cardholders from HDFC Bank, ICICI Bank, and IndusInd Bank.

Advertising Campaign 
After rebranding, InterMiles launched their first Television advertisement in 2020. This advertisement showed the protagonist using InterMiles and getting rewards on flight bookings, hotel stays, and restaurants.

See also

 Online shopping

References

External links
 

Online travel agencies
Indian travel websites
Travel websites
Travel ticket search engines
Comparison shopping websites
Companies based in Mumbai
Online retailers of India
Travel and holiday companies of India
 
Payment systems